...Sketches of a Man is the third studio album by American musician Dwele. It was released on June 24, 2008 via Koch Records. Recording sessions took place at the Loft in Detroit, at Durt Factory in Norfolk, at 916 Studios in Universal City, and at the Chop Shop in Brooklyn. Production was mainly handled by Dwele himself, in addition to G-1, Mr. Lee, Nottz and Joe Archie. It features guest appearances from J. Tait, Lloyd Dwayne and Slum Village.

The music video for the song "I'm Cheatin'" features an appearance from Detroit-bred model and Playboy cybergirl Erika Mayshawn.

Track listing

Personnel

Andwele "Dwele" Gardner – vocals, producer, arranger
Jason "Elzhi" Powers – vocals
R.L. "T3" Altman III – vocals
Lloyd Dwayne – vocals
James Tait – vocals
Carmelita Wingate – additional vocals
Kendra Parker – additional vocals
Raynee Crowe – additional vocals
Darren Brown – additional vocals
Mario "Khalif" Butterfield – additional vocals, photography
DeSabata Robinson – lead guitar
Dominick "Nottz" Lamb – producer, recording
George "G-One" Archie – producer, programming, recording
Joe Archie – associate producer, additional programming
Leroy "Mr. Lee" Williams – producer
Darryl Sloan – recording
Todd Fairall – mixing
Kirk Yano – mixing
Arnold Mischkulnig – mixing, mastering
David "DJ Quik" Blake – mixing
Shane "West Coast" McClain – engineering
Quran Hill – engineering, assistant mixing
Chris Athens – mastering
Ronald "Ron E." Estill – executive producer
Timothy Maynor – executive producer
Tilmon Welch – associate executive producer

Charts

References

External links

2008 albums
Dwele albums
E1 Music albums
Albums produced by G-One
Albums produced by Nottz